The 2014 Wyoming Cavalry season is the team's fifteenth season as a professional indoor football franchise and fourth in the current Indoor Football League (IFL). One of nine teams competing in the IFL for the 2014 season, the Wyoming Cavalry are members of the Intense Conference. Led by head coach Ryan Lingenfelder, the team plays their home games at the Casper Events Center in Casper, Wyoming.

Awards and honors
On March 5, 2014, the IFL announced its Week 2 Players of the Week. Wyoming Cavalry linebacker David Stlouis received an Honorable Mention for defense. On March 12, 2014, the IFL announced its Week 3 Players of the Week. Wyoming Cavalry kick returner Justin Cooper received an Honorable Mention for special teams play. On March 19, 2014, the IFL announced its Week 4 Players of the Week. Wyoming Cavalry wide receiver Samuel Charles received an Honorable Mention for offense.

On April 2, 2014, the IFL announced its Week 6 Players of the Week. Wyoming Cavalry defensive lineman Bryson Kelly was named as the Defensive Player of the Week. On April 9, 2014, the IFL announced its Week 7 Players of the Week. Wyoming Cavalry kick returner Vincent Taylor was named as the Special Teams Player of the Week. Quarterback Sam Durley received an Honorable Mention for offense. Linebacker Bruna Foster and defensive back Jahmil Taylor each received an Honorable Mention for special teams play.

On April 16, 2014, the IFL announced its Week 8 Players of the Week. Wyoming Cavalry defensive back Jahmil Taylor received his second Honorable Mention of the season but his first for defense.

Schedule
Key:

Regular season
All start times are local to home team

Roster

Standings

References

External links
Wyoming Cavalry official website
Wyoming Cavalry official statistics
Wyoming Cavalry at Casper Star-Tribune

Wyoming Cavalry
Wyoming Cavalry seasons
Wyoming Cavalry